The following is a list of religious radio stations divided by country.

American Samoa
KKBT Leone
KSBS-FM Pago Pago

Argentina
FM Santa Rosa Pilar, Buenos Aires Province
Radio Betania Pilar, Buenos Aires Province
Radio Buenos Aires Buenos Aires

Australia
1WAY FM                        - Canberra, Australian Capital Territory
96five                         - Brisbane, Queensland
 97seven           - Darwin, Northern Territory
 Faith FM - Australia wide
 Hope103.2       - Sydney, New South Wales
 Juice107.3          - Gold Coast, Queensland
 Life FM     - Adelaide, South Australia
Life FM    - Sale, Victoria
Light FM                       - Melbourne, Victoria
Rhema FM    - Newcastle, New South Wales
Rhema FM - Manning Great Lakes, New South Wales
Sonshine FM                    - Perth, Western Australia
Ultra106five    - Hobart, Tasmania
Vision Radio Network           - Australia wide
Way FM                         - Launceston, Tasmania
96three - Geelong, Victoria
 HCJB                           - Kununurra, Western Australia
Live99.9             - Townsville, Queensland
 Pulse94.1 - Wollongong, New South Wales

Bosnia and Herzegovina
 Radiopostaja Mir Međugorje – Catholic radio www.radio-medjugorje.com   
 Radio Marija – Catholic radio www.radiomarija.ba
 Radio BIR – Islamic radio www.bir.ba

Canada

See List of Christian radio stations in Canada.

Croatia
 Radio Marija – Catholic radio www.radiomarija.hr
 Croatian Catholic Radio – Christian radio

Cyprus
Logos Radio

Finland
Radio Dei

Germany
ERF Radio

Guam
KHMG Barrigada
KOLG Hagåtña
KSDA Agat (Adventist World Radio)
KTWG Agana (Trans World Radio)

Iceland
Lindin (also heard in the Faroe Islands)

Ireland
 Radio North/Gospel 846am http://www.radionorth.net
Spirit Radio
Let The Bible Speak
http://www.ltbs.tv

Israel
Kol BaRama
Kol Chai
Radio Agape

Italy
PfarrRadio Schlern
Radio Evangelo Piemonte
Radio Maria
Radio Mater
Radio In Blu (mainly as Radio syndication)
Radio Torino Biblica

Japan
FEBC Japan - Christian Radio
JOQR-AM - Catholic/Shintoist/Buddhist (Soka Gakkai). (Society of St. Paul is the majority owner.)

Korea, South
 Won Buddhism Broadcasting System (Wonmu Banseong) - FM Radio, Won Buddhism

Mauritania
Radio Qur'an

Montenegro
 Radio Fatih - Islamic radio 
 Radio Svetigora - Orthodox Church radio www.svetigora.com

New Zealand
Life FM (Radio Network)
Star (Radio Network)
Rhema (Radio Network)
United Christian Broadcasters

Philippines
99.9 Country Baguio
105.3 Iloilo
DWGV Angeles City
DWIZ Metro Manila
DWXI Metro Manila
DXVP Zamboanga City
DYMI 94.7 Calinog, Iloilo
DYSA-AM Iloilo
DZAR Metro Manila
DZAS Metro Manila
DZEC Metro Manila
DZEM Metro Manila
DZJV Calabarzon
DZME Metro Manila
DZMM Metro Manila
DZRJ-AM Metro Manila
DZRV Metro Manila
DZXL Metro Manila
Master's Touch 98.7
Power 92.7 San Fernando
DXGN 89.9 FM Davao City

Poland
Radio Maryja
Radio RDN

Portugal
Rádio Maria – Catholic radio www.radiomaria.pt
Rádio Canção Nova – Catholic radio radio.cancaonova.pt

Puerto Rico
WBMJ San Juan
WCGB Juana Díaz
WCRP Guayama
WIDA-FM Carolina
WIVV Vieques
WNRT Manatí
WNVM Cidra
WPPC Peñuelas
WTPM Aguadilla
WYAS Luquillo

Serbia
 Радио Слово Љубве - Orthodox Church radio www.slovoljubve.com

Spain
 Radio María – Catholic radio

The Vatican
Vatican Radio

United Kingdom
Hope FM - Adventist Hope Media on DAB: Lincolnshire(Block:12A),North Yorkshire(Block:10C), NE Wales W Chesh(Block:10D) ,Hereford-Worcs(Block:12A) website
Hope FM Bournemouth
Cross Rhythms City Radio
Cross Rhythms Plymouth
Radio Cracker
Premier Christian Radio on Sky Channel 0123 website
Revival FM (Scotland)
TWR-UK (Trans World Radio) Christian Radio on Freeview 733, Freesat 790, Sky Channel 0128 website
United Christian Broadcasters Talk Christian Radio on Sky Channel 0135 website
United Christian Broadcasters UK Christian Radio on Sky Channel 0125 website
Flame CCR Christian Community Radio from the Wirral website
Lancashire's Lighthouse Radio
Radio Outreach
Voice Of Islam Radio , VOI website

United States
Air 1 (Network) Rocklin, California Stations: KAGT, WAWE
American Family Radio (Network) Tupelo, Mississippi
Bible Broadcasting Network Charlotte, North Carolina
enLighten (XM)
EWTN Radio, Irondale, Alabama
WEWN Shortwave Radio ,Irondale, Alabama (International shortwave service of EWTN Radio)
Family Radio Oakland, California (Network) Stations: KCLM, KEAR (AM), KEBR, KECR, KFRN, KPHF, WCUE, WFME-FM, WWFR, and WYMK
WYFR Okeechobee, Florida (International shortwave service of Family Radio—now closed and transmitters sold to WRMI: Radio Miami International) < http://mt-shortwave.blogspot.com/2013/06/wyfr-to-close-all-shortwave-services.html> <http://mt-shortwave.blogspot.com/2013/11/wyfr-facility-to-return-to-shortwave-as.html>
Family Talk XM Satellite Radio (Salem Communications)
KAFC Anchorage, Alaska
KAGV Big Lake, Alaska
KAIM-FM Honolulu, Hawaii (Salem Communications)
KANI Wharton, Texas
KANN Roy, Utah
KATH (AM) Dallas, Texas
KBIQ Manitou Springs, Colorado (Salem Communications)
KBHL Osakis, Minnesota
KBJD Denver, Colorado (Salem Communications)
KBVM Portland, Oregon
KCMM Belgrade, Montana
KCRO Omaha, Nebraska (Salem Communications)
KDAR Oxnard, California (Salem Communications)
KDNW Duluth, Minnesota
KDOV Medford, Oregon
KEXS Excelsior Springs, Missouri
KFAX San Francisco, California (Salem Communications)
KFEL Pueblo, Colorado
KFIA Carmichael, California (Salem Communications)
KFIS Scappoose, Oregon (Salem Communications)
KFNW-FM Fargo, North Dakota
KFSH-FM Anaheim, California (Salem Communications)
KFSI Rochester, Minnesota
KGBI-FM Omaha, Nebraska (Salem Communications)
KGFT Pueblo, Colorado (Salem Communications)
KGNW Seattle, Washington (Salem Communications)
KGTN-LP Georgetown, Texas
KGU Honolulu, Hawaii (Salem Communications)
KHOY Laredo, Texas
KHPE Albany, Oregon
KHRT Minot, North Dakota
KICY Nome, Alaska
KICY-FM Nome, Alaska
KJOL Grand Junction, Colorado
KJON Carrollton, Texas
KJVA-LP San Bernardino, California
KKEQ Fosston, Minnesota
KKFS Lincoln, California (Salem Communications)
KKHT-FM Winnie, Texas (Salem Communications)
KKJM St. Joseph, Minnesota
KKLA-FM Los Angeles, California (Salem Communications)
KKMS Richfield, Minnesota (Salem Communications)
KKSP Bryant, Arkansas
KLBE-LP Bismarck, North Dakota
KLFE Seattle, Washington (Salem Communications)
K-LOVE Winchester, Oregon (Network) Stations: KAKL, KKLC, KLBF, KLDQ, KLFV, KLRX, KLVU, KVID, KVKL, KVLB, KYLV, WAKL, WBKL, WKVB, WKVE, WKVK, WKVW, WLKB, WLKU, WLVE, WYDA, and WZLV
KLUX Corpus Christi, Texas (Diocesan Telecommunications, Catholic Communications Network)
KLTY Arlington, Texas (Salem Communications)
KMTL Sherwood, Arkansas
KMZL Missoula, Montana
KMZO Hamilton, Montana
KNDR Bismarck, North Dakota
KNLR Bend, Oregon
KNLS Anchor Point, Alaska
KNOM Nome, Alaska
KPDQ (AM) Portland, Oregon (Salem Communications)
KPDQ-FM Portland, Oregon (Salem Communications)
KPHN El Dorado, Kansas
KPOF AM91 Denver's Point of Faith Westminster, Colorado website
KPUL Winterset, Iowa
KQOV-LP Butte, Montana
KPSH Coachella, California
KPRZ San Marcos-Poway, California (Salem Communications)
KPXQ Glendale, Arizona (Salem Communications)
KRFF-LP Moorhead, Minnesota
KRKS, KRKS-FM Denver, Colorado (Salem Communications)
KSGN Riverside, California
KSLR San Antonio, Texas (Salem Communications)
KSOS Las Vegas, Nevada
KSPH Springhill, Louisiana
KTIS Minneapolis/St. Paul
KTIS-FM Minneapolis/St. Paul
KTLW Lancaster, California
KVOH Rancho Simi, California
KVRP (AM) Stamford, Texas
KWND Springfield, Missouri
KWTL Grand Forks, North Dakota
KWRD-FM Highland Village, Texas (Salem Communications)
KYFG Omaha, Nebraska
Northern Christian Radio Gaylord, Michigan
Pilgrim Radio (Network) Stations: KCSP-FM and KNIS
Radio Maria (USA) (KJMJ Alexandria, Louisiana 
Radio Paz Miami, Florida
Radio Peace Miami, Florida
Relevant Radio Green Bay, Wisconsin (Network) Stations: KVXR, WDVM, WJOK, WKBM, WLOL, WMMA-FM, and WSJP-FM
Smile FM (Network) Stations: WAIR, WCZE, WLGH
Spirit (XM)
The Catholic Channel (XS)
The Message (XM)
The Station of the Cross (Network) Stations: WHIC, WLOF and WQOR
The Torch (XM)
Trans World Radio Cary, North Carolina
KTBN (shortwave) Salt Lake City, Utah (International shortwave service of KTBN)
VCY America Radio Network Milwaukee, Wisconsin
WACQ Tuskegee, Alabama
WAFJ Augusta, Georgia
WAFS (AM) Atlanta, Georgia (Salem Communications)
WAGG Birmingham, Alabama
WAKW Cincinnati, Ohio
WAML (AM) Laurel, Mississippi
WAMV Amherst, Virginia
WAVA Arlington, Virginia (Salem Communications)
WAVA-FM Arlington, Virginia (Salem Communications)
WAYF West Palm Beach, Florida
WAYH Harvest, Alabama
WAYK Valley Station, Kentucky (Salem Communications)
WBIB Centreville, Alabama
WBOZ Woodbury, Tennessee (Salem Communications)
WBTG-FM Sheffield, Alabama
WBVM Tampa, Florida
WBXB Edenton, North Carolina
WCAR Livonia, Michigan
WCGL Jacksonville, Florida
WCKI Greer, South Carolina
WCLN-FM Elizabethtown, North Carolina
WCMD-FM Barre, Vermont
WCPK Chesapeake, Virginia
WCPS Tarboro, North Carolina
WCRJ Jacksonville, Florida
WCSG Grand Rapids, Michigan
WCVC Tallahassee, Florida
WCVK Bowling Green, Kentucky
WCVO Gahanna, Ohio
WDEO (AM) Ypsilanti, Michigan
WDSA Dothan, Alabama
WDTF-LP Berkeley Springs, West Virginia
WEAF (AM) Camden, South Carolina
WEXY Wilton Manors, Florida
WEUP (AM) Huntsville, Alabama
WEUV Moulton, Alabama
WEZE Boston, Massachusetts (Salem Communications)
WFBM-LP Lewistown, Pennsylvania
WFFH Nashville, Tennessee (Salem Communications)
WFFI Nashville, Tennessee (Salem Communications)
WFHM-FM Cleveland, Ohio (Salem Communications)
WFIA New Albany, Indiana (Salem Communications)
WFIL Philadelphia, Pennsylvania (Salem Communications)
WFSH-FM Athens, Georgia (Salem Communications)
WFTH Richmond, Virginia
WGOK Mobile, Alabama
WGPL Portsmouth, Virginia
WGRB Chicago, Illinois
WHBB Selma, Alabama
WHIF Palatka, Florida
WHKW Cleveland, Ohio (Salem Communications)
WHKZ Warren, Ohio (Salem Communications)
WHLY South Bend, Indiana
WHMA (AM) Anniston, Alabama
World Harvest Radio International Cypress Creek, South Carolina
WIDU Fayetteville, North Carolina
WIGN Bristol, Tennessee
WIHM Taylorville, Illinois
WILB Canton, Ohio
WIMG Trenton, New Jersey
WJOU Huntsville, Alabama
WJUS Marion, Alabama
WLPS-FM Lumberton, North Carolina
WLQV Detroit, Michigan (Salem Communications)
WLTA Alpharetta, Georgia (Salem Communications)
WMCA New York, New York (Salem Communications)
WNHG Grand Rapids, Michigan
WNIV Atlanta, Georgia (Salem Communications)
WNOP Cincinnati, Ohio
WOAD (AM) Jackson, Mississippi
WONG Canton, Mississippi
WOOF (AM) Dothan, Alabama
WORD-FM Pittsburgh, Pennsylvania (Salem Communications)
WPCE Portsmouth, Virginia
WPMH Newport News, Virginia
WRBZ Wetumpka, Alabama
WRCS Ahoskie, North Carolina
WREN Carrollton, Alabama
WRFD Columbus, Ohio (Salem Communications)
WRKS Pickens, Mississippi
WRMK Augusta, Georgia
WRMQ Rejoice, Orlando, Florida (Q Broadcasting - Rejoice)
WROL Boston, Massachusetts (Salem Communications)
WRYT Edwardsville, Illinois
WSEL-FM Pontotoc, Mississippi
WSOK Savannah, Georgia
WTBN Pinellas Park, Florida (Salem Communications)
WTLN Orlando, Florida (Salem Communications)
WTSK Tuscaloosa, Alabama
WTUA St. Stephen, South Carolina
WUAF-LP Lake City, Florida
WVTJ Pensacola, Florida
WWEV Cumming, Georgia
WWCR Worldwide Christian Radio Nashville, Tennessee
WWDJ Boston, Massachusetts (Salem Communications)
WWOS Walterboro, South Carolina
WWOW Conneaut, Ohio
WXKD Monroeville, Alabama
WXQW Fairhope, Alabama
WYCA Crete, Illinois
WYCV Granite Falls, North Carolina
WYLL Chicago, Illinois (Salem Communications)
WYLS York, Alabama
WYNN (AM) Florence, South Carolina
WZAZ Jacksonville, Florida

U.S. Virgin Islands
WDHP Frederiksted
WEVI Frederiksted
WGOD-FM Charlotte Amalie
WIVH Christiansted

External links
SnapFM - Simple Internet Radio Featuring Over 50 Religious Stations Nationwide
Christian Media Australia - Christian Broadcasting in Australia

Religious
 Radio stations